William Locker (16 February 1866 – 15 August 1952)  was an English footballer and cricketer. He played first-class cricket for Derbyshire between 1894 and 1903 and football for Stoke, Derby County and Notts County. He was one of nineteen sportsmen to achieve the Derbyshire Double of playing cricket for Derbyshire and football for Derby County.

Locker was born in Long Eaton, Derbyshire, the son of William Locker and his wife Mary. His father was a lace maker and at the age of 15 Locker was a lace threader.

Football career
Locker played association football for Stoke, Derby County and Notts County. His only appearance for Stoke came in a 2–1 defeat at home to Preston North End in November 1889. Whilst with Notts County he achieved 12 goals in the 1890/91 season and played in the 1891 FA Cup Final on the losing side.

Cricket career
Locker made his first appearances for Derbyshire in the 1894 season. He next played for them in one match in the 1899 season which was his County Championship debut – an innings defeat by Worcestershire. He played fully for Derbyshire in the 1901 season. He played one match in the 1902 season and one in the 1903 season. He was a right-handed batsman who played 30 innings in 16 matches with a top score of 76 and an average of 17.03. During his time with Derbyshire, he was an upper-middle order batsman.

Locker died in California, Derby aged 86.

Career statistics

Honours
Notts County
FA Cup finalists: 1891

See also
List of English cricket and football players

References

1866 births
1952 deaths
People from Long Eaton
Footballers from Derbyshire
Cricketers from Derbyshire
English cricketers
Derbyshire cricketers
English footballers
Association football inside forwards
Long Eaton Rangers F.C. players
Stoke City F.C. players
Notts County F.C. players
Derby County F.C. players
English Football League players
FA Cup Final players